Justin Gignac is a freelance artist best known for creating NYC Garbage and Wants For Sale, and his work on Elf Yourself.

References

External links
 

Year of birth missing (living people)
Artists from New York City
Living people